National Tertiary Route 744, or just Route 744 (or ) is a National Road Route of Costa Rica, located in the Alajuela province.

Description
In Alajuela province the route covers San Carlos canton (Pital district), Río Cuarto canton (Río Cuarto, Santa Rita, Santa Isabel districts).

References

Highways in Costa Rica